Englebert Mollin (born 1904, date of death unknown) was a Belgian wrestler. He competed in the Greco-Roman lightweight event at the 1924 Summer Olympics. He also won a silver medal at the 1930 European Wrestling Championships.

References

External links
 

1904 births
Year of death missing
Olympic wrestlers of Belgium
Wrestlers at the 1924 Summer Olympics
Belgian male sport wrestlers
Place of birth missing
20th-century Belgian people